The 2014 Bloc Québécois leadership election was held June 14, 2014 to choose a successor for Daniel Paillé who resigned on December 16, 2013 due to health reasons.

Voter turnout in the election was 58.5%, up from the 2011 leadership election, with approximately 19,000 members voted by telephone to elect Daniel Paillé's successor.

Timeline
May 2, 2011: Federal election reduces the Bloc Québécois to 4 seats in the House of Commons. Party leader Gilles Duceppe loses his own riding in Laurier—Sainte-Marie and announces his resignation.
December 11, 2011: Daniel Paillé is elected leader at the party's 2011 leadership election.
February 27, 2013: Jonquière—Alma MP Claude Patry leaves the New Democratic Party caucus to join the Bloc Québécois.
September 12, 2013: Ahuntsic MP Maria Mourani is expelled from the Bloc Québécois caucus due to comments against the provincial Parti Québécois government's proposed Quebec Charter of Values.
December 16, 2013: Paillé resigns the leadership and presidency due to health concerns. Richmond—Arthabaska MP André Bellavance is named interim parliamentary leader, and vice-president Annie Lessard is named the interim president.
February 22, 2014: André Bellavance announces his candidacy.
February 26, 2014: André Bellavance resigns as parliamentary leader, and Haute-Gaspésie—La Mitis—Matane—Matapédia MP Jean-François Fortin is named interim parliamentary leader.
April 8, 2014: Official start to the leadership race.
May 7, 2014: Last date for candidates to submit $15,000 entry fee and for candidates to file a nomination form signed by a total of at least 1,000 party members from across at least 25 ridings.
May 15, 2014: Deadline for membership and renewals.
May 24, 2014: Candidates debate during BQ policy convention in Rimouski. 
June 11–13, 2014: Party members vote by telephone.
June 14, 2014: The winner of the leadership election  announced.
June 23–25, 2014: The party holds a convention in Rimouski, where the new leader officially assumes the leadership of the party.

Official candidates
Candidates who have submitted the $15,000 registration fee and 1,000 signatures gathered from at least 25 ridings.

Mario Beaulieu
Background
Leader of the Société Saint-Jean-Baptiste (2009–2014).

Positions
Bealieu argues that the BQ should more strongly emphasize Quebec independence and accuses Bellavance of wanting to water down sovereignty to win votes.

Date campaign announced:  April 28, 2014 
Date officially registered: May 7, 2014 
Supporters
Prominent supporters: Bernard Landry, former Premier of Quebec; Djemila Benhabib, essayist and former Parti Québécois candidate; Lucie Laurier, actress; national executive of the Forum jeunesse du Bloc Québécois (Bloc Quebecois youth wing);  Xavier Barsalou-Duval, Bloc youth wing president; Yves Beauchemin, author

André Bellavance
Background
MP for Richmond—Arthabaska (2004–present)
Leader of the party in the House of Commons (2013–2014)

Positions
Has said that for the Bloc to revive itself it must become more than a coalition of sovereigntists.

Date campaign announced:  February 22, 2014
Date officially registered: May 5, 2014 
Supporters
MPs: (3) Jean-François Fortin, Haute-Gaspésie—La Mitis—Matane—Matapédia; Claude Patry, Jonquière—Alma; Louis Plamondon, Bas-Richelieu—Nicolet—Bécancour
Former MPs: Daniel Turp
Others: Vivian Barbot, former president of the party; and some 30 former Bloc MPs

Declined
Pierre Curzi, former MNA for Borduas (2007–2012)
Gilles Duceppe, former MP for Laurier—Sainte-Marie (1990–2011) and Bloc Québécois leader (1997–2011)
Pierre Duchesne, former Quebec Minister of Higher Education and MNA for Borduas (2012–2014)
Jean-François Fortin, MP for Haute-Gaspésie—La Mitis—Matane—Matapédia
Bernard Landry, former Premier of Quebec (2001–2003)
Pierre Paquette, former MP for Joliette (2000–2011)
Daniel Turp, former MP for Beauharnois—Salaberry (1997-2000) and MNA for Mercier (2003-2008).

Results

See also
 2011 Bloc Québécois leadership election
 42nd Canadian federal election

References

2014
2014 elections in Canada
2014 in Quebec
Bloc Québécois leadership election